Taavi Vartia (born 9 November 1965, in Helsinki, Finland) is a Finnish Film director, script writer and writer. Taavi Vartia has since 1990 planned, directed and produced programmes for all of Finland's national television channels: YLE TV1, YLE TV2, MTV3 and Nelonen, across a range of genres including drama, entertainment, music, profiles and documentaries. He has been involved in the production of over 1100 episodes. Vartia has also written and directed several company- and image videos for Finnish companies. In recent years he has received recognition as a writer of young adult dramas and as a documentary film maker. Vartia has published four novels. Vartia founded Taaborin kesäteatteri/ Taabori Summer Theater in Nurmijärvi 2009 and started to run the movie theatre Kino Juha 2019.

Feature films
 Pertsa ja Kilu/ Finders of the Lost Yacht. Script writer and Director. Premiered in July 2021.
 Rölli ja kaikkien aikojen salaisuus/ Rolli and the Secret of All Times. Script writer and Director. Premiered in September 2016.
 Lomasankarit/ The Island of Secrets. Script writer and Director. Premiered in October 2014.
Rölli ja kultainen avain/ Rölli and the Golden Key]. Script writer and Director. Premiered in February 2013

Programmes

Drama
Kevyttä yläpilveä/ World's safest place (Elisa Viihde & Nelonen, Warner Bros./2020) 8 episodes. Original idea and director.
Huone 301/ Man in Room 301 (Elisa Viihde & Warner Bros./2019) Co-Producer in Greece with Ikas Film & TV Productions.
Keisari Aarnio/ King Liar (Nelonen/ 2018), 10 episodes, directed 3.
Syke/ Nurses (TV1 & Nelonen/ 2015-2018). Director seasons 3, 5 and 6. The third season won 2016 Kultainen Venla in category the best TV-programme.
Downshiftaajat/ Downshifters (Elisa Viihde & YLE TV2/ 2016-2017). Director, season 2. 
Käenpesä family drama (MTV3/ 2005–2006) 16 episodes. Director, one of many directors
Suolaista vettä drama for young people (TV1/ 2000) 6 episodes. Script Writer (original theme by Kari Levola)
Pertsan ja Kilun uudet seikkailut drama for young people (TV2/ 2000). Director and Script writer. Actors: Santeri Kinnunen, Vesa Vierikko, Eija Vilpas, Jaana Saarinen, Ismo Apell and Tapio Liinoja
Samaa Sukua, eri maata family drama (TV1/ 1997–98) 46 episodes. Director
Houdinin pojat mini serial (MTV3/ 1997) 4 episodes. Director, producer
Isäni on Supermies drama for young people (FST/ not filmed) 6 episodes. Script Writer (Script support by Nordiska Kulturfonden 2001)
Komisario Koivu detective comedy (TV1/ 1996) 28 episodes. Direction, one of many script writers
Marskin poika television film (TV1/ 1995). Direction, dramatization
Tapulikylä family drama (TV1/ 1995) 5 episodes. Director

Entertainment and talk shows
Kuvia ja käännekohtia/ Pictures and Turning Points(AlfaTV/2017-) . Producer, host.
Kamera käy/ Action (AlfaTV/2017-2018), 29 episodes. Producer and host with Jenni Banerjee.
Ota tai Jätä (Deal Or No Deal) format (Nelonen/ 2007) 10 episodes. Director
Big Brother format (SubTv/ 2006) 6 episodes. Live-action director of first six parts
Pääroolissa "Lets make a film"- entertainment (TV1/ 2005) 8 episodes. Director, Host
Diili (The Apprentice) format (MTV3/ 2004) 15 episodes. Director
Videotreffit video date entertainment for young people (TV2/ 1999) 18 episodes. Director
Ben Furman, talk show (TV1/1999) 18 episodes. Director
Haastattelijana Mirja Pyykkö, talk show (TV1/1995-97) 40 episodes. Director, Producer
Sinun Unelmiesi Tähden human fantasies (TV1/ 1995) 10 episodes. Director
Etusivu uusiksi press competition (TV2/ 1995) 50 episodes. Host
Tämä on minun quiz (TV1/ 1994) 18 episodes. Director
Erotico-tico erotic sketch show (TV1/ 1992) 18 episodes. Director, Script Writer

Music entertainment and concerts
Seinäjoen Tangomarkkinat/ Tango Festival in Seinäjoki -concerts(Alfa TV/2018): Queen's Final, King's Final, Meidän Tango/ Our Tango -Concert and Semi Finals in Kerava. Director. 
Seinäjoen Tangomarkkinat/ Tango Festival in Seinäjoki -concerts (Alfa TV/2017): Queen's Final, King's Final, Tango Finlandia -Concert and Semi Finals in Kerava. Director. 
Kirka –taiteilijajuhlakonsertti concert (TV1/ 1998). Director
Toivomuslähde (TV2/ 1998) 19 parts. Director
Puhdas Elämä Lapselle concerts 1996 and 1997 at the Olympic Stadium (MTV3). Director
Euroviisut 1996 Eurovision Song Contest, Finnish Competition (TV1/ 1999). Director
Danny –taiteilijajuhlakonsertti (TV1/ 1996). Director
Sarajevo-konsertti at the Olympic Stadium (TV1/ 1995). Director, reporter
Euroviisut 1994 Eurovision Song Contest, Finnish Competition (TV1/ 1994). Director
Katri Helena 50-v –konsertti concert (TV1/ 1994). Director
Pellit auki (TV1/1993) 6 parts. Director

Documentaries and current affairs
Silicon Valley Baby (2020) documentary film. Executive producer, Production company Taavi Vartia Film & TV. 
Itämeri (Baltic Sea (MTV3/ 2012) 12 episodes. Director, Script writer
After the Blood Diamonds documentary film (Sierra Leone) for international distribution (2008–2009). Director, writer
Suomen Historia history of Finland (TV1/1998) 4 episodes. Director, producer
Suomalainen kirjallisuuden historia history of Finnish Literature (TV1/1998) 4 episodes. Director
Testamentti profiles (TV2/ 1998) 10 episodes. Producer
Sata sanaa literature programme (TV1/20001) 50 episodes. Director, Planning
Aleksis K literature programme (YleTeema/ 2000) 38 episodes. Director, producer
Tosi Tarina profiles (TV1/ 2000) 5 episodes. Reporter, director
Katsojan suora opinion programme (TV2/ 1998) 30 parts. Producer
Eläköön viini! fact/entertainment (Nelonen/ 1998) 10 episodes. Director, Planning
Kirurgia Nyt! serial of modern medicin (TV1/ 1997) 10 episodes. Director, producer
Miisa matkalla tähtiin? profile/report (TV1/1996). Reporter, director
Venäläinen Baletti – taide, uskonto ja filosofia documentary of the stars of Bolshoi Theatre (TV2/ 1990). Director, reporter
Päiväntasaaja current affairs/ entertainment (TV/ 1995) 50 episodes. Producer, Host/ Reporter

Others
Games of the XXVII Olympiad in Athens 2004 (several channels worldwide/ 2004). Slomotion Director in international field (running)
Drive or Die direct theatre broadcasting from Kaapelitehdas (TV1/ 1997). TV Direction
Orvot direct theatre play broadcasting from Kansallisteatteri/National Theatre (TV1/1997). TV Direction

Theatre
Taavi Vartia has directed numerous plays for the whole family at the Taaborin kesätetatteri/ Taabor Summer Theater, which he founded in 2009.
The summer theater is based in Taaborinvuori, Nurmijärvi, Finland.
2020 Vaahteramäen Eemeli/ That Boy Emil. Playwright Astrid Lindgren. 
2019 Tuhkimo/ Cinderella. Playwright
2018 Peppi Pitkätossu/ Pippi Longstocking. Playwright Astrid Lindgren. 
2017 Heinähattu, Vilttitossu ja Rubensin veljekset. Playwright Tiina Nopola and Sinikka Nopola.
2016 Risto Räppääjä ja Nelli Nuudelipää. Playwright Tiina Nopola and Sinikka Nopola
2015 Zorro. Playwright Esa Silander. 
2014 Peter Pan. Playwright. 
2013 Vaahteramäen Eemeli/ That Boy Emil. Playwright Astrid Lindgren. 
2012 Gangsteri ja kaunotar. Playwright. 
2011 Kaikkien aikojen Robin Hood/ The all-time Robin Hood. Playwright
2009 ja 2010 Kaikkien aikojen Pertsa ja Kilu. Playwright
2008 Kaikkien aikojen Pertsa ja Kilu. Kirjurinluodon kesäteatteri. Director and Playwright.

Novels
Varastettu Vaimo ("Stolen Wife"),, published August 2015 by Paasilinna Kustannus.
Tuulen viemä mies ("Man Gone with the Wind"),pages 503, published August 2012 by Helsinki Kirjat.
Viikinkipoika Kaspar: Sininen Viikinki ja Kuninkaan sotaratsu ("The Viking Boy Kaspar: Blue Viking and war knight of the King"),pages 392, published July 2011 by Helsinki Kirjat.
Viikinkipoika Kaspar ("The Viking Boy Kaspar"), pages 239, / 978-952-5874-76-1 (ePub eBook). Published 2.February 2011 by Helsinki Kirjat.
Rölli ja kultainen avain (Rölli and the Golden Key), . Published January 2013 by Otava.

References

External links 
 Official Homepages
 IMDB

Living people
Finnish television directors
1965 births